Eritrea competed at the 2020 Summer Olympics in Tokyo. Originally scheduled to take place from 24 July to 9 August 2020, the Games were postponed to 23 July to 8 August 2021, because of the COVID-19 pandemic. It was the nation's sixth consecutive appearance at the Summer Olympics.

Competitors
The following is the list of number of competitors in the Games.

Athletics

Eritrean athletes achieved the entry standards, either by qualifying time or by world ranking, in the following track and field events (up to a maximum of 3 athletes in each event):

Track & road events
Men

Women

Cycling

Road
Eritrea entered a squad of three riders (two men and one woman) to compete in their respective Olympic road races, by virtue of their top 50 national finish (for men) and top 100 individual finish (for women) in the UCI World Ranking.

Swimming

Eritrea received a universality invitation from FINA to send a top-ranked male swimmer in his respective individual events to the Olympics, based on the FINA Points System of June 28, 2021, marking the country's debut in the sport.

References

Nations at the 2020 Summer Olympics
2020
2021 in Eritrean sport